The  woolly-necked stork has been split into two species:

 Asian woolly-necked stork, Ciconia episcopus
 African woolly-necked stork, Ciconia microscelis